Brand New by Tomorrow is Money Mark's seventh solo studio album, which was released on February 5, 2007. The first single was "Pick Up The Pieces", which was co-written by Jack Johnson.

Reception 
Brand New by Tomorrow received a rating of 6.2 by Pitchfork. The melancholy nature of the lyrics about a failed relationship saw comparisons by some critics to Beck's 2002 album Sea Change.

In popular culture 
The song "Color of Your Blues" was used in the trailer for the 2008 documentary Dear Zachary: A Letter to a Son About His Father, a film about the murder of Andrew Bagby.

Track listing 
 "Color of Your Blues'" – 3:20
 "Pick up the Pieces" – 3:25
 "Summer Blue" – 3:25
 "Pretend to Sleep" – 2:21
 "My Loss, Your Gain" – 3:05
 "Robot Friends" - 2:99
 "Every Day I Die a Little" – 3:09
 "Radiate Nothing" – 3:15
 "Black Butterfly" – 3:32
 "Nice To Me" – 2:51
 "Eyes That Ring" – 3:48
 "Brand New by Tomorrow" – 3:20

References 

2007 albums
Money Mark albums
Brushfire Records albums